The Nevada State Medical Association (NSMA) is the professional organization representing physicians in Nevada. Founded in 1875 and incorporated in 1904, the NSMA is a non-profit organization that consists of physicians, medical students, and residents.  It is currently based in Reno, Nevada. The NSMA is the Nevada affiliate of the American Medical Association.

History
Henry Bergstein, MD was elected to the Nevada Assembly in 1874, and sponsored a successful bill to regulate the practice of medicine in the state.  The law passed in 1875, and it limited the practice of medicine and surgery to graduates of bona fide medical schools.  The law required physicians to register with their county, and assigned a fine to those who were not in compliance.  In 1875, Bergstein founded the Nevada State Medical Society (NSMS) in Virginia City, Nevada to enforce the new law.  John W. Van Zant, MD was elected the first president.  The Nevada Supreme Court upheld the law as constitutional, and in 1899, the Nevada State Board of Medical Examiners was created to supplant the enforcement role of the NSMS.  The NSMS was incorporated in 1904 with the Nevada Secretary of State, and the first annual meeting of the reorganized NSMS was held in Reno on May 6, 1905.  The Clark County Medical Society was granted a charter in 1930, and the White Pine County Medical Society held their first meeting in 1931.  The name of the organization was changed to the Nevada State Medical Association to more accurately reflect that it is composed of many county societies.

Leadership
Tomas Hinojosa, MD, President
Weldon D. Havins, MD, President-Elect
Howard I. Baron, MD, Secretary
Steven Parker, MD, Treasurer
Mitchell D. Forman, DO, Immediate Past President
G. Norman Christiensen, MD, Rural Representative
Wayne C. Hardwick, MD, Chief AMA Delegate
Florence Jameson, MD, AMA Delegate
Peter R. Fenwick, MD, AMA Alternate Delegate
Catherine O'Mara, JD, Executive Director

County medical societies
Carson Douglas County Medical Society
Central Counties Medical Society
Clark County Medical Society
Elko County Medical Society
Washoe County Medical Society
White Pine County Medical Society

References

External links
 Nevada State Medical Association - Official Site

Medical and health organizations based in Nevada
American Medical Association
1875 establishments in Nevada
Organizations established in 1875